The 2002 Italian Open (also known as 2002 Rome Masters) was a tennis tournament played on outdoor clay courts. It was the 59th edition of the Italian Open and was part of the Tennis Masters Series of the 2002 ATP Tour and of Tier I of the 2002 WTA Tour. Both the men's and women's events took place at the Foro Italico in Rome in Italy. The men's tournament was played from May 6 through May 12, 2002 while the women's tournament was played from May 13 through May 19, 2002.

Finals

Men's singles

 Andre Agassi defeated  Tommy Haas 6–3, 6–3, 6–0
 It was Agassi's 3rd title of the year and the 53rd of his career. It was his 2nd Masters title of the year and his 14th overall.

Women's singles

 Serena Williams defeated  Justine Henin-Hardenne 7–6(8–6), 6–4
 It was Williams' 3rd title of the year and the 14th of her career. It was her 2nd Tier I title of the year and her 5th overall.

Men's doubles

 Martin Damm /  Cyril Suk defeated  Wayne Black /  Kevin Ullyett 7–5, 7–5
 It was Damm's 2nd title of the year and the 22nd of his career. It was Suk's 2nd title of the year and the 24th of his career.

Women's doubles

 Virginia Ruano Pascual /  Paola Suárez defeated  Conchita Martínez /  Patricia Tarabini 6–3, 6–4
 It was Ruano Pascual's 3rd title of the year and the 16th of her career. It was Suárez's 3rd title of the year and the 23rd of her career.

References

External links
 Official website  
 Official website 
 ATP Tournament Profile
 WTA Tournament Profile 

Italian Open
Italian Open
 
Italian Open (Tennis)
2002 Italian Open (Tennis)